Erdenechimeg Luvsannorov (born 1957) is an ethnomusicologist and researcher.

Biography 
Erdenechimeg was born in Ulaanbaatar, Mongolia.
She descends from a family who studied in the fields of linguistics and folklore. Her research focus is ancient Asian music theory and history. Erdenechimeg was a visiting scholar at the Indiana University Department of Central Eurasian Studies from 2005–2008.

Education 
Erdenechimeg earned her bachelor's degree in Music from the Musical College in Ulaanbaatar, Mongolia in 1978. Her Bachelor's and Master's Degree's were earned at the Tchaikovsky Conservatory (with Dr. Pr. Yuri Nikolaevich Kholopov) in Moscow, Russia from 1980–1986. She studied Musicology at the Shanghai Conservatory (with Pr. Chen Ying Shi) from 1997–1999. Erdenechimeg earned two doctorate degrees, with the first dissertation titled The Consonant and Dissonant Sounds of the Harmony of the Horse-headed Fiddle at the Mongolian National University of Art in 1993 and the second, titled The Harmony of the Mongolian Meditation Guru Song, at the Mongolian Academy of Sciences in 2000. Since 2000, Erdenechimeg has been an Associate Professor in the Department of Music Theory of the Mongolian National University of Art.

Publications 
Erdenechimeg has written over 15 musicological and ethno-musicological books in Mongolian, several of which are also published in Chinese, Russian and English. Her book Eighteen Songs of a Nomad Flute is the first translation and commentary that translates ancient Chinese into Mongolian. This book was published in 2002 and again in 2003 after much popularity. It was eventually published in Chinese, Mongolian, and English including Erdenechimeg's focus on the interrelated aspects of the poem with instrumental music, song, art, and drama. The Mongolian composer Tsogzolyn Natsagdorj worked on an opera of this poem as a result of this book.

Erdenechimeg has also taught and presented 16 educational courses on early Asian and European music, its folklore, literature, theory, and history. In addition, she has given 29 international presentations and has written and published more than 60 scientific articles as a result of her research.
 L. Erdenechimeg (1994), “The traditional melody of the horse-headed fiddle” 1994, UB; Mongolia, Publication by: “Shuvuun saaral” publishing company.
 L. Erdenechimeg (1996), “The wedding songs of the Buriat minorities” 1995, UB; Mongolia, Publication by: “Choijil” publishing company; Gov Blg 20A, (Hevlelted 1996-5-16,297x210/32) 
 L. Erdenechimeg (1996), “The collection of Guru Songs” 1996, UB, Mongolia, Publication by: “Shuvuun saaral” publishing company.
 L. Erdenechimeg (2001), “The sounds harmony of the meditation Guru Songs’ 2001, UB, Publication by: “Intersperses” publishing company; .
 L. Erdenechimeg (2002), “The Princess a Tsai Wen Ji’s eighteen songs of a nomadic flute” 2003, UB; Publication by: “Edmon” publishing company; “Admon” Publishing Company, 2002, (21xx), UB, Mongolia, .
 L. Erdenechimeg (2003), The yang and ying twelve microtones from the horse fiddle" 2003, UB, Mongolia, Publication by: “Sod press” Publishing Company; (10.1xx), 176x250, .
 L. Erdenechimeg (2004), ”Western composers of the XXth century” 2004, UB, Mongolia, Publication by: “Sukhbaatar” Publishing Company;

Professional societies 
Erdenechimeg is a member of the Mongolian Composers Union (1997), the International Nomadic Institute (2000) and the Chinese Traditional Musical Association (2002).

Awards and distinctions 
 "Top Writer of the Year" from Il Tovchoo (Open Chronicle) newspaper (1992)
 Korean Youth Federation Award (1994)
 Mongolian University Consortium Award (1995)
 Distinguished Cultural Worker Award (1996)
 Mongolian Composer's Union Award (1997)
 An award from the Federation of American Mongolians in 1997 for best presentation in the international conference
 The Mongolian Science Academy Award (2002)
 Two awards from the British Buddhist Association (2002 and 2003)
 The "Altan Gadas" (Order of the Polar Star) medal from the government of Mongolia (2004)
 President of the Mongolian Wind Instrument Association (2003), the Mongolian International Musicological Association (2004), the International Traditional Musicological Association (2004) and Mongolian Society at Indiana University (2005)

References

1957 births
Living people
Indiana University faculty
Mongolian academics
Mongolian expatriates in China
Mongolian expatriates in the Soviet Union
Mongolian expatriates in the United States
Moscow Conservatory alumni
Musicologists
Mongolian composers
People from Ulaanbaatar
National University of Mongolia alumni